Hidropark is a water park, located in Alcúdia, Majorca, Spain. Besides water slides, the park features a 54-hole golf course, inflatable castles, floating balls and trampolines.

References

Water parks in Spain